is a passenger railway station located in the city of Tamba, Hyōgo Prefecture, Japan, operated by West Japan Railway Company (JR West).

Lines

Station layout
The station consists of two opposed ground-level side platforms connected to the station building by a footbridge. The station is unattended. The station building is located along the platform serving Track 1.

Platforms

Adjacent stations

History
Kuroi Station opened on July 15, 1899 as a station of Hankaku Railway, which was nationalized in 1907. With the privatization of the Japan National Railways (JNR) on April 1, 1987, the station came under the aegis of the West Japan Railway Company.

Passenger statistics
In fiscal 2016, the station was used by an average of 486 passengers daily

Surrounding area
former Kasuga Town Hall)
Tamba City Kasuga Library
Kasuga Culture Hall
Kasuga Museum of History and Folklore
Kuroi Castle (nationally designated historic site)

See also
List of railway stations in Japan

References

External links

 Station Official Site

Railway stations in Hyōgo Prefecture
Railway stations in Japan opened in 1899
Tamba, Hyōgo